Zuitou is a town in and the county seat of Taibai County of Baoji, Shaanxi, China.

References

Township-level divisions of Shaanxi